Leonard Schultze refers to:
The Leonard Schultze languages of Papua New Guinea
The Leonard Schultze River of Papua New Guinea
Leonhard Schultze-Jena (1872-1955), a German zoologist and anthropologist
Leonard Schultze, the founder of Schultze & Weaver